Meenuliyan Para or Meenulinjan para (മീനുളിയന്‍ പാറ) is a mountain peak situated near Thodupuzha in Idukki district, in the Indian state of Kerala.  , 

It is noted for a huge rock that rises more than 4000 feet - hence the name 'Para' (which means 'rock' in the Malayalam language) - and has about two acres of evergreen forest on top of it. The rock itself covers an area more than 500 acres. The mountain's name derives from the apparent resemblance of its rocky surface to fish scales. The mountain's peaks are often covered in mist on rainy days but on clear days, the lower Periyar area, Bhoothathankettu and even Ernakulam may be visible from the peaks vantage points.
Meenuliyan para is located 47 km from Muvattupuzha and 51 km from Thodupuzha.  Meenuliyan para can be reached only by a pedestrian path for about 3 km from Pattayakkudy, in Vannappuram Panchayath in Idukki district.  Cochin Port and parts of Thrissur district can also be seen from top of the Meenuliyan para.

References

Mountains of Kerala